The following is a list of awards and nominations received by American rock musician Chris Cornell.

Clio Awards

|-
|1995 || Black Hole Sun (with Soundgarden)|| Alternative Music Video || 
|-

GAFFA Awards
The GAFFA Awards is an annual awards ceremony established in 1991 by the Danish magazine of the same name.

|-
| 1999
| Chris Cornell
| Foreign New Act
| 
|-
| 2006
| Chris Cornell
| Foreign Singer of the Year
| 
|-
|}

Grammy Awards
The Grammy Awards are awarded annually by the National Academy of Recording Arts and Sciences.

|-
| style="text-align:center;"| 1990 || Ultramega OK (with Soundgarden)|| Best Metal Performance || 
|-
| style="text-align:center;"| 1992 || Badmotorfinger (with Soundgarden)|| Best Metal Performance || 
|-
| style="text-align:center;"| 1993 || "Into the Void (Sealth)" (with Soundgarden)|| Best Metal Performance || 
|-
| style="text-align:center;"| 1995 || "Spoonman" (with Soundgarden)|| Best Metal Performance || 
|-
| style="text-align:center;"| 1995 || "Black Hole Sun" (with Soundgarden)|| Best Hard Rock Performance || 
|-
| style="text-align:center;"| 1995 || "Black Hole Sun" (with Soundgarden)|| Best Rock Song || 
|-
| style="text-align:center;"| 1995 || Superunknown (with Soundgarden)|| Best Rock Album || 
|-
| style="text-align:center;"| 1997 || "Pretty Noose" (with Soundgarden)|| Best Hard Rock Performance || 
|-
| style="text-align:center;"| 2000 || "Can't Change Me" || Best Male Rock Vocal Performance || 
|-
| style="text-align:center;"| 2004 || "Like a Stone" (with Audioslave)|| Best Hard Rock Performance || 
|-
| style="text-align:center;"| 2004 || Audioslave (with Audioslave)|| Best Rock Album || 
|-
| style="text-align:center;"| 2006 || "Doesn't Remind Me" (with Audioslave)|| Best Hard Rock Performance || 
|-
| style="text-align:center;"| 2008 || "You Know My Name" from Casino Royale || Best Song Written for a Motion Picture, Television or Other Visual Media || 
|-
| style="text-align:center;"| 2011 || "Black Rain" (with Soundgarden)|| Best Hard Rock Performance || 
|-
| style="text-align:center;"| 2018 || "The Promise" from The Promise || Best Rock Performance || 
|-
| style="text-align:center;"| 2019 || "When Bad Does Good" || Best Rock Performance || 
|-
| style="text-align:center;"| 2022 || "No One Sings Like You Anymore, Vol. 1" || Best Rock Album  || 
|-
| style="text-align:center;"| 2022 || "Nothing Compares 2 U" ||  Best Rock Performance  || 
|-

Golden Globe Awards

|-
| style="text-align:center;"| 2012 || "The Keeper" from Machine Gun Preacher || Best Original Song ||

Hollywood Music in Media Award

|-
| style="text-align:center;"| 2017 || "The Promise" from The Promise || Original Song - Feature Film ||

MTV Video Music Awards
The MTV Video Music Awards is an annual awards ceremony established in 1984 by MTV.

|-
| style="text-align:center;"| 1994 || "Black Hole Sun" (with Soundgarden) || MTV Video Music Award for Best Rock Video ||

MTV Europe Music Awards

|-
| 1994 
| Soundgarden 
| Best Rock 
|

MusiCares MAP Fund
The Stevie Ray Vaughan Award is given annually by the MusiCares MAP Fund honoring musicians for their devotion to helping other addicts struggling with the recovery process.

|-
|2007
|Chris Cornell
|Stevie Ray Vaughan Award
|

Northwest Area Music Awards
The Northwest Area Music Awards (NAMA) was an awards ceremony held by the Northwest Area Music Association.

|-
| align="center" rowspan="2"| 1991 || | Chris Cornell || Best Male Vocalist || 
|-
| |Soundgarden || Best Rock Group || 
|-
| align="center" rowspan="3"| 1992 || Chris Cornell || Best Male Vocalist || 
|-
| Badmotorfinger || Best Metal Album || 
|-
| Soundgarden || Best Metal Group ||

Revolver Golden Gods Awards
The Revolver Golden Gods Awards is an annual awards ceremony held by Revolver, an American hard-rock and heavy metal magazine.

|-
| align="center" rowspan="3"| 2013 || | King Animal (with Soundgarden) || Album of the Year || 
|-
| | Soundgarden || Comeback of the Year || 
|-
| | Chris Cornell || Best Vocalist ||

Satellite Awards

|-
| style="text-align:center;"| 2006 || "You Know My Name" from Casino Royale || Best Original Song || 
|-
| style="text-align:center;"| 2018 || "The Promise" from The Promise || Best Original Song ||

World Soundtrack Awards

|- 
| style="text-align:center;"| 2007 || "You Know My Name" from Casino Royale || Best Original Song Written Directly for a Film ||

References 

Awards
Chris Cornell